The 1873 Dundee by-election was fought on 5 August 1873.  The byelection was fought due to the resignation of the incumbent MP of the Liberal Party, George Armitstead.  It was won by the Liberal candidate James Yeaman.

References

1873 elections in the United Kingdom
1873 in Scotland
1870s elections in Scotland
19th century in Dundee
By-elections to the Parliament of the United Kingdom in Dundee constituencies
By-elections to the Parliament of the United Kingdom in Scottish constituencies